Nia Kai Reed (born June 27, 1996) is an American professional volleyball player who plays as an opposite hitter for the United States women's national volleyball team and for South Korean professional team Gwangju AI Peppers.

Early life

Reed was born in Cleveland, Ohio to parents William and JoMoree. She grew up in Fort Lee, New Jersey and attended high school at Immaculate Heart Academy. At Immaculate Heart, she was a four-year starter and led her team to four straight non-public state championships. She was named Player of the Year in 2011, 2012 and 2013 and played on the USA Volleyball Girls' Youth A2 team. She was the 12th ranked national recruit in her graduating class, and chose to play for Russ Rose at Penn State.

Career

College
While at Penn State, Reed redshirted her freshman year, with her career spanning a total of five seasons from 2014–2018. Penn State won the NCAA national championship in 2014 during her redshirt season, although she was unable to play in any matches. She helped lead Penn State to the 2017 Final Four during her junior season. In 2018, her final season with Penn State, she was named an AVCA honorable mention All-American after finishing the season with a team-best 3.26 kills per set, hitting .253 and scoring 385.0 points. Penn State won a Big Ten title in 2017.

Professional clubs

  Halkbank Ankara (2018–2019)
  Edremit Bld. Altınoluk (2019–2020)
  Volero Le Cannet (2020–2021)
  Sesi Vôlei Bauru (2021–2022)
  Gwangju AI Peppers (2022–)

USA National Team
In May 2022, Reed made her national team playing debut when she was named to the 25-player roster for the 2022 FIVB Volleyball Nations League tournament.

Awards and honors

Clubs
 2020–2021 Brazilian Cup –  Champion, with Sesi Vôlei Bauru.
 2021–2022 South American Club Championship –  Bronze medal, with Sesi Vôlei Bauru
 2021–22 Brazilian Superliga –  Bronze medal, with Sesi Vôlei Bauru
 2021–22 Paulista Championship –  Bronze medal, with Sesi Vôlei Bauru

College
2014  NCAA Division I National Champions
AVCA Honorable Mention All-American (2018)

References

External links
Team USA profile

1996 births
Living people
Sportspeople from Cleveland
Opposite hitters
American women's volleyball players
Penn State Nittany Lions women's volleyball players
American expatriate sportspeople in France
Expatriate volleyball players in France
American expatriate sportspeople in Brazil
Expatriate volleyball players in Brazil
American expatriate sportspeople in South Korea
Expatriate volleyball players in South Korea
American expatriate sportspeople in Turkey
Expatriate volleyball players in Turkey
African-American volleyball players
People from Fort Lee, New Jersey
20th-century African-American people
21st-century African-American sportspeople
21st-century African-American women
Immaculate Heart Academy alumni